The Diocese of Hålogaland was a diocese in the Church of Norway. The Diocese covered the Lutheran Church of Norway churches located within all of Northern Norway (including Nordland, Troms, and Finnmark county along with the territory of Svalbard).  The diocese was headquartered in the city of Tromsø at the Tromsø Cathedral.  The diocese was dissolved in 1952 when it was split into the Diocese of Nord-Hålogaland and the Diocese of Sør-Hålogaland.

History
Originally, this area was a part of the great Diocese of Nidaros, which covered all of Norway from Romsdalen north.  On 30 December 1803, the King of Norway named Peder Olivarius Bugge the "Bishop of Trondheim and Romsdal" and also named Mathias Bonsach Krogh the "Bishop of Nordland and Finnmark", thus essentially splitting the diocese into two (but legally it was one diocese with two bishops).  The new Bishop Krogh made Alstahaug Church the seat of his bishopric in the north, while Bishop Bugge stayed in Trondheim at the Nidaros Cathedral.  The new diocese in the north was formally established on 14 June 1844 as Tromsø stift and it was to be seated in the city of Tromsø.  Work on a new cathedral was begun soon after. The new Tromsø Cathedral was completed in 1864. The name of the diocese was changed to Hålogaland bispedømme in 1918. In 1952, the Diocese of Hålogaland was split into two: the Diocese of Sør-Hålogaland (which covered Nordland county) and the Diocese of Nord-Hålogaland (which included Troms and Finnmark county and Svalbard).

Bishops
Below is a list of the bishops of Hålogaland during its whole existence.

1804-1828: Mathias Bonsach Krogh
1830-1848: Peder Christian Hersleb Kjerschow
1849-1855: Daniel Bremer Juell
1855−1860: Knud Gislesen
1861−1867: Carl Peter Parelius Essendrop
1868−1876: Fredrik Waldemar Hvoslef
1876−1885: Jakob Sverdrup Smitt
1885−1892: Johannes Nilssøn Skaar
1893−1909: Peter Wilhelm Kreydahl Bøckmann
1910−1918: Gustav Dietrichson
1918−1928: Johan Støren
1928−1937: Eivind Berggrav
1937−1939: Sigurd Johan Normann
1940−1952: Wollert Krohn-Hansen

References

Haalogaland
Nordland
Troms
Finnmark
Culture of Svalbard